Group B of the 2018 Fed Cup Europe/Africa Zone Group II was one of two pools in the Europe/Africa zone of the 2018 Fed Cup. Four teams competed in a round robin competition, with the top two teams and the bottom two teams proceeding to their respective sections of the play-offs: the top two teams played for advancement to Group I, while the third placed team faced potential relegation to Group III. The bottom placing team was automatically relegated to Group III.

Standings 

Standings are determined by: 1. number of wins; 2. if two teams have the same number of wins, head-to-head record; 3. if three teams have the same number of wins, (a) number of matches won in the group, then (b) percentage of sets won in the group, then (c) percentage of games won in the group, then (d) Fed Cup rankings.

Round-robin

Norway vs. Israel

Bosnia and Herzegovina vs. Luxembourg

Norway vs. Luxembourg

Bosnia and Herzegovina vs. Israel

Norway vs. Bosnia and Herzegovina

Israel vs. Luxembourg

References

External links 
 Fed Cup website

A2